A synonym is a word, morpheme, or phrase that means exactly or nearly the same as another word, morpheme, or phrase in a given language. For example, in the English language, the words begin, start, commence, and initiate are all synonyms of one another: they are synonymous. The standard test for synonymy is substitution: one form can be replaced by another in a sentence without changing its meaning. Words are considered synonymous in only one particular sense: for example, long and extended in the context long time or extended time are synonymous, but long cannot be used in the phrase extended family. Synonyms with exactly the same meaning share a seme or denotational sememe, whereas those with inexactly similar meanings share a broader denotational or connotational sememe and thus overlap within a semantic field. The former are sometimes called cognitive synonyms and the latter, near-synonyms, plesionyms or poecilonyms.

Lexicography
Some lexicographers claim that no synonyms have exactly the same meaning (in all contexts or social levels of language) because etymology, orthography, phonic qualities, connotations, ambiguous meanings, usage, and so on make them unique. Different words that are similar in meaning usually differ for a reason: feline is more formal than cat; long and extended are only synonyms in one usage and not in others (for example, a long arm is not the same as an extended arm). Synonyms are also a source of euphemisms.

Metonymy can sometimes be a form of synonymy: the White House is used as a synonym of the administration in referring to the U.S. executive branch under a specific president. Thus, a metonym is a type of synonym, and the word metonym is a hyponym of the word synonym.

The analysis of synonymy, polysemy, hyponymy, and hypernymy is inherent to taxonomy and ontology in the information science senses of those terms. It has applications in pedagogy and machine learning, because they rely on word-sense disambiguation.

Etymology

Sources

Synonyms are often some from the different strata making up a language. For example, in English, Norman French superstratum words and Old English substratum words continue to coexist. Thus, today we have synonyms like the Norman-derived people, liberty and archer, and the Saxon-derived folk, freedom and bowman. For more examples, see the list of Germanic and Latinate equivalents in English.

Loanwords are another rich source of synonyms, often from the language of the dominant culture of a region. Thus, most European languages have borrowed from Latin and ancient Greek, especially for technical terms, but the native terms continue to be used in non-technical contexts. In East Asia, borrowings from Chinese in Japanese, Korean, and Vietnamese often double native terms. In Islamic cultures, Arabic and Persian are large sources of synonymous borrowings.

For example, in Turkish,  and  both mean 'black', the former being a native Turkish word, and the latter being a borrowing from Persian. As always with synonyms, there are nuances and shades of meaning or usage.

In English, similarly, we often have Latin (L) and Greek (Gk) terms synonymous with Germanic ones: thought, notion (L), idea (Gk); ring, circle (L), cycle (Gk). English often uses the Germanic term only as a noun, but has Latin and Greek adjectives: hand, manual (L), chiral (Gk); heat, thermal (L), caloric (Gk). Sometimes the Germanic term has become rare, or restricted to special meanings: tide, time/temporal, chronic.

Many bound morphemes in English are borrowed from Latin and Greek and are synonyms for native words or morphemes: fish, pisci- (L), ichthy- (Gk).

Another source of synonyms is coinages, which may be motivated by linguistic purism. Thus, the English word foreword was coined to replace the Romance preface. In Turkish,  was coined to replace the Arabic-derived mektep and mederese, but those words continue to be used in some contexts.

Uses

Synonyms often express a nuance of meaning or are used in different registers of speech or writing.

Different technical fields may appropriate synonyms for specific technical meanings.

Some writers avoid repeating the same word in close proximity, and prefer to use synonyms: this is called elegant variation. Many modern style guides criticize this.

Examples 

Synonyms can be any part of speech, as long as both words belong to the same part of speech. Examples:

noun: drink and beverage
verb: buy and purchase
adjective: big and large
adverb: quickly and speedily
preposition: on and upon

Synonyms are defined with respect to certain senses of words: pupil as the aperture in the iris of the eye is not synonymous with student. Similarly, he expired means the same as he died, yet my passport has expired cannot be replaced by my passport has died.

A thesaurus or synonym dictionary lists similar or related words; these are often, but not always, synonyms.

 The word poecilonym is a rare synonym of the word synonym. It is not entered in most major dictionaries and is a curiosity or piece of trivia for being an autological word because of its meta quality as a synonym of synonym.
 Antonyms are words with opposite or nearly opposite meanings. For example: hot ↔ cold, large ↔ small, thick ↔ thin, synonym ↔ antonym 
 Hypernyms and hyponyms are words that refer to, respectively, a general category and a specific instance of that category. For example, vehicle is a hypernym of car, and car is a hyponym of vehicle.
 Homophones are words that have the same pronunciation but different meanings. For example, witch and which are homophones in most accents (because they are pronounced the same).
 Homographs are words that have the same spelling but different meanings. For example, one can record a song or keep a record of documents.
 Homonyms are words that have the same pronunciation and spelling but different meanings. For example, rose (a type of flower) and rose (past tense of rise) are homonyms.

See also 
 -onym
 Synonym (taxonomy)
 Cognitive synonymy
 Elegant variation, the gratuitous use of a synonym in prose
 Synonym ring
 Synonymy in Japanese

References

External links

Types of words
Semantic relations